Uroš Petrović (born August 8, 1990) is a Serbian professional basketball player who last played for Peñas Huesca of the Liga Española de Baloncesto.

References

External links
  at fiba.com
  at basketball.asia-basket.com
  at euroleague.net
  at basketball.realgm.com

1990 births
Living people
ABA League players
Aries Trikala B.C. players
Basketball League of Serbia players
CB Peñas Huesca players
KK Hemofarm players
BC Balkan Botevgrad players
People from Knjaževac
Serbian expatriate basketball people in Bulgaria
Serbian expatriate basketball people in Greece
Serbian expatriate basketball people in Iran
Serbian expatriate basketball people in Lithuania
Serbian expatriate basketball people in North Macedonia
Serbian expatriate basketball people in Romania
Serbian expatriate basketball people in Spain
Serbian men's basketball players
Power forwards (basketball)